James Calvin Ewing (born 1867 in Suisun, California- died January 19, 1937) was founder and president of the Pacific Coast League 1907-1909 and owner of the San Francisco Seals and Oakland Oaks.

Ewing co-founded the Pacific Coast League in 1903 with Henry Harris (then co-owner of the Seals). In the aftermath of the 1906 San Francisco earthquake, Ewing used his own money to sustain the league. He was League President 1907-1909.

He owned the Oaks until 1929 until forced to sell, as a result of ill health.

He financed the construction of Ewing Field, which bore his name.

In addition, Ewing is a member of the Pacific Coast League Hall of Fame.

Notes

Pacific Coast League

1867 births
1937 deaths
Minor league baseball executives
Sportspeople from California
People from Suisun City, California